Je m'appelle Barbra (1966) is the eighth studio album released by Barbra Streisand. She sings much of the album in French.

The album peaked at #5 on the Billboard 200, and was certified gold by the RIAA on April 24, 2002, almost 36 years after its original release. It was also Streisand's last album to make the Top 10 until 1971, when Stoney End reached #10.

Track listing

Side one
"Free Again" (Joss Baselli, Armand Canfora, Robert Colby, Michel Jourdan) – 3:43
"Autumn Leaves" (Joseph Kosma, Johnny Mercer, Jacques Prévert) – 2:50
"What Now My Love" (Gilbert Bécaud, Pierre Delanoë, Carl Sigman) – 2:41
"Ma première chanson" (Eddy Marnay, Barbra Streisand) – 2:19
"Clopin clopant" (Bruno Coquatrix, Pierre Dudan, Kermit Goell) – 3:10
"Le Mur" (Charles Dumont, Michel Vaucaire)– 2:34

Side two
"I Wish You Love" (Albert A. Beach, Léo Chauliac) – 3:01
"Speak to Me of Love" (Jean Lenoir, Bruce Sievier) – 2:52
"Love and Learn" (Norman Gimbel, Michel Legrand, Marnay) – 2:29
"Once Upon a Summertime" (Eddie Barclay, Legrand, Marnay, Mercer) – 3:37
"Martina" (Legrand, Hal Shaper) – 2:21
"I've Been Here" (Dumont, Earl Shuman, Vaucaire) – 2:31

En Français EP
An EP was released in Europe in July 1966 called "Barbra Streisand En Français" with four French recordings:
"Non c'est rien" ('Free Again' - French version)
"Les Enfants qui pleurent" ('Martina' - French version)
"Et la mer"
"Le Mur" ('I've Been Here' - French version)

Single
"Free Again" / "I've Been Here" 1966

Personnel
Barbra Streisand – vocals
Michel Legrand – arranger, conductor
Ray Ellis – arranger, conductor (on "What Now My Love")
Maurice Chevalier – liner notes
Nat Shapiro – liner notes
Richard Avedon – cover photographer

Notes
Je m'appelle Barbra contains Streisand's first songwriting credit, for "Ma première chanson".

This album marks the first time Streisand collaborated with Michel Legrand, who arranged and conducted most of the album.

The album cover was photographed by Richard Avedon.

A song called "Look" was also recorded for this album, but was used as a b-side to the single: "Stout-Hearted Men" from Barbra's next album Simply Streisand (1967).

Charts

Certifications

References

External links
The Barbra Streisand Music Guide – Je m'appelle Barbra
Barbra Archives - Je m'appelle Barbra page with vintage clippings, quotes from Legrand and Streisand about recording the album, plus album cover outtakes by Avedon. 

Barbra Streisand albums
Albums arranged by Michel Legrand
1966 albums
Columbia Records albums
French-language albums
Albums conducted by Michel Legrand